Monastyryshche is a city in Uman Raion of Cherkasy Oblast (province) of Ukraine. It hosts the administration of Monastyryshche urban hromada, one of the hromadas of Ukraine. Population: 

Until 18 July 2020, Monastyryshche served as an administrative center of Monastyryshche Raion. The raion was abolished in July 2020 as part of the administrative reform of Ukraine, which reduced the number of raions of Cherkasy Oblast to four. The area of Monastyryshche Raion was merged into Uman Raion.

Hassidic Dynasty
Rabbi Mordechai Rosen was head dean, and grand rabbi of the village of Monistrich, known as Monastyrysche in Ukrainian. He perished during the Holocaust in World War II and was survived by his sons R. Nachman and R. Froim.

The biography of this rabbi can be found in many Hebrew religious books, among them "Ner Nachman".

References

External links
 The murder of the Jews of Monastyryshche during World War II, at Yad Vashem website.

Cities in Cherkasy Oblast
Cities of district significance in Ukraine
Kiev Governorate
Holocaust locations in Ukraine